Geza Csosz (born April 1,1968) is a Hungarian-born English photographer.

Life and work
Csosz began his photographic studies in Ecole des Beaux-Arts Sion in Switzerland, then completed his studies at UNI Vienna and finally at the Szellemkép Szabadiskolában in Budapest.

Next to him, he became known as an enamel artist. He had several exhibitions e.g. in Budapest at the Ericsson Gallery of Fine Arts Gallery, in Szeged at the Southern Hungarian Creative House, in Zurich, in Sion, in Munich. After several years of persecution in Hungary, he moved to the UK.

Books 
 Portishead. Self-published. 
 Black on Black. 
 My Family and the Like. 
 PseudoPrivat. Self-published. 
 Remove from me lies. Self-published. 
 Exhilio. Self-published.

Exhibitions

Films 
 Eszencia (Szilasi László)

References 

Living people
1968 births
Hungarian photographers
British photographers
British photojournalists
Hungarian emigrants to the United Kingdom